Harold Barton (1910–1969) was an English footballer.

Harold Barton may also refer to:

Harold Barton (cricketer) (1882–1970), English cricketer
Harold Barton (Hawkeye), fictional character

See also
Harry Barton (disambiguation)
Harold Bartron (1896–1975), US Brigadier General